2 for the Show is the tenth album released by MC Breed. It was released on November 23, 1999, for Power Records, distributed by Roadrunner Records and was produced by MC Breed, Jazze Pha, Big L, 8Ball & MJG, Rob "Masta" Allen, South O, Mike Dean, Sedric "Swift" Barnett, B. Wild, Mr. Lee, Theo G, Colin Wolfe and Jermaine Tipton. 2 for the Show was a concept album with all the songs being a duet between Breed and another rapper.

Track listing
"Gotta Get Mine (Remix)"- 4:20 (Featuring 2Pac) 
"Sesshead Funk Junky"- 4:29 (Featuring 8Ball & MJG) 
"Mo' Money to Get"- 4:11 (Featuring Paycheck) 
"2-2 da Chest"- 4:30 (Featuring DFC) 
"Rebel Slave"- 4:26 (Featuring Southclick)  
"Everyday Thang in da Hood"- 4:04 (Featuring Ghetto Mafia) 
"No Future"- 4:25 (Featuring Bootleg) 
"Better Now"- 3:59 (Featuring Big Mike) 
"Conclusion"- 5:15 (Featuring Too Short) 
"Think About It"- 4:43 (Featuring Hardboyz)   
"Let's Go to da Club"- 4:16 (Featuring Erotic D)

References

MC Breed compilation albums
Vocal duet albums
Albums produced by Jazze Pha
1999 compilation albums
Albums produced by Big L
Albums produced by 8Ball & MJG
Gangsta rap compilation albums